Juan Amores (25 October 1963 – 28 August 2015) was a Costa Rican long-distance runner. He competed in the men's marathon at the 1988 Summer Olympics.

References

External links

1963 births
2015 deaths
Athletes (track and field) at the 1988 Summer Olympics
Costa Rican male long-distance runners
Costa Rican male marathon runners
Olympic athletes of Costa Rica